Hod or HOD may refer to:
 Brick hod, a long-handled box for carrying bricks or mortar
 Coal scuttle, bucket-like container for carrying coal
 Hawk (plasterer's tool), used to hold plaster
 a container used to hold clams when clam digging
 Home and Office Delivery, a water dispenser intended for domestic use (see also Water cooler)

Places 
 Hod Hill, an archaeological site in Dorset, England
 Hod HaSharon, city in the Center District of Israel
 Hollinwood railway station, England

Judaism 
 Hod (Kabbalah), part of the Tree of Life
 Hod (organization), an Israel-based organization for Jewish homosexuals
 Halachic Organ Donor Society, an Israeli medical organization

People 
 Hod Eller (1894–1961), American baseball player
 Hod Fenner (1897–1954), American baseball player
 Hod Ford (1897–1977), American baseball player
 Hod Kibbie (1903–1975), American baseball player
 Hod Leverette (1889–1958), American baseball player
 Hod Lipson (born 1967), American engineer
 Hod Lisenbee (1898–1987), American baseball player
 Hod O'Brien (born 1936), American jazz pianist
 Hod Stuart (1879–1907), Canadian hockey player
 Nir Hod (born 1970), Israeli-American artist

Other uses 
 Castlevania: Harmony of Dissonance, 2002 Game Boy Advance game
 Höðr, a god in Norse mythology
 Halo occupation distribution in cosmology and astrophysics
 Heart of Darkness, a novel
 Head of Department(HOD)
 Heart of Darkness (video game)
 Hereditarily ordinal definable, in set theory
 Heritage Open Days, annual UK event
 Histogram of oriented displacements, descriptor for 2D trajectories intended for describing trajectories of human joints
 Hodeida International Airport, in Yemen
 Hodiernal tense
 Holma language, spoken in Nigeria
 Hydrogen on demand, generating hydrogen for a fuel cell or internal combustion engine instantly when needed 
 Hypertrophic osteodystrophy, a bone disease in young dogs
 IBM Websphere Host On-Demand, a software from IBM
 Hod, an ancient city mentioned in Tales of the Abyss.
 Outpatient clinic (hospital department), Hospital Outpatient Department

See also
 Hodd (disambiguation)